Peera Garhi Chowk is a major intersection of Outer Ring Road and Rohtak Road (NH10). It lies in the Paschim Vihar area, and is a major transport hub. It has many bus stops and a Metro station (Peera Garhi station).

Streets in Delhi